The Southeast Water Trough is an historic structure located in Des Moines, Iowa, United States.  It is one of the last of 15 National Humane Alliance fountains that were placed around the city by the Iowa Humane Alliance.  They were also named Ensign fountains after the founder of the National Humane Alliance, Hermon Lee Ensign.  This was one of two placed in Des Moines in 1906.

Four small cups are located at the base to provide water for smaller animals. The fountain rests on a base of tiles. It is a reminder of the horse and buggy era before the prevalence of indoor plumbing. While it served a practical function of watering horses, it also served a social function as a place where people in the local community could gather.

The structure was listed on the National Register of Historic Places in 1976.

References

Infrastructure completed in 1906
Buildings and structures in Des Moines, Iowa
National Register of Historic Places in Des Moines, Iowa
Drinking fountains in the United States
1906 establishments in Iowa